Thomas Dodge Homestead is a historic home in Port Washington, Nassau County, New York.  It is a settlement-era farmhouse dated to 1721 with additions completed in approximately 1750 and 1903.  It is a -story, L-shaped, heavy timber-frame building sheathed with natural cedar wood shingles.  The main block has a saltbox shape and there is a nearly square, -story gable-roofed wing.  Also on the property are a contributing barn (1880), privy (1886), chicken coop, and shed.  It is operated as a historic house museum by the Cow Neck Peninsula Historical Society, which has its headquarters in the Sands-Willets Homestead, another historic house museum.

Thomas Dodge Homestead was listed on the National Register of Historic Places in 1986.

References

External links
Thomas Dodge Homestead (Cow Neck Peninsula Historical Society website)

Historic house museums in New York (state)
Houses on the National Register of Historic Places in New York (state)
Houses completed in 1721
Houses in Nassau County, New York
Museums in Nassau County, New York
National Register of Historic Places in North Hempstead (town), New York
1721 establishments in the Province of New York